Jūratė Regina Statkutė de Rosales is a Lithuanian-born Venezuelan journalist and amateur historian. She has published studies in Venezuela, Spain, the United States and Lithuania in which she claims that the Goths were not a Germanic but a Baltic people.

Biography 
Rosales was born on 9 September 1929 in Kaunas, Lithuania and lived with her parents, at least partly in Paris, until 1938. Her father, Jonas Statkus, was head of the State Security Department of Lithuania until he was arrested on 6 July 1940 along with Augustinas Povilaitis, General Kazys Skučas, and several other high officials after the Soviet ultimatum to Lithuania. He was sent to Butyrka prison in Moscow where it is presumed he died on an unknown date. After the end of the Second World War, Rosales moved to France where she learned Latin and French, receiving a degree as a teacher of French. She continued her studies at Columbia University in New York, where she taught English, Spanish, and German. In 1960 she married Venezuelan engineer Luis Rosales; they raised five children—Luis, Juan, Sarunas, Rimas, and Saulius—in a multi-lingual household, using both Spanish and Lithuanian. Starting in 1983 she held the position of editor-in-chief of the Venezuelan opposition magazine Zeta, in addition to writing for Venezuelan daily paper El Nuevo País and the Cleveland-based Dirva. She holds an honorary doctorate from the Lithuanian University of Educational Sciences.

Hypothesis on the Goths being Baltic 
Rosales has published studies in the US, Spain, Venezuela, and Lithuania supporting the idea that the Goths were a Baltic, not Germanic people. Rosales traces her research on the controversial hypothesis back to 17th-century Prussian scholar Matthäus Prätorius who is thought to have first proposed the idea, which was supported by several Lithuanian historians including Simonas Daukantas and Česlovas Gedgaudas as well as linguist Kazimieras Būga.

The idea has been heavily criticized by other academics such as Zigmas Zinkevičius as pseudohistory primarily driven by nationalist, not academic concepts. Professors Alvydas Butkus and Stefano M. Lanza make similar criticisms of her methodology, to the point of accusing her of twisting the meaning of sources and using "nonexistent" Lithuanian words. In response to Butkus and Lanza, de Rosales pointed out their lack in depth of knowledge when analysing of her texts and that they only focused on one page of the book, ignoring the rest.

References

 

1929 births
Lithuanian emigrants to Venezuela
Living people
Linguists from Lithuania
Pseudohistorians
Venezuelan women journalists
Columbia University alumni
Writers from Kaunas